Anantara Siam Bangkok Hotel is a hotel property located in the Ratchadamri area in the Pathum Wan District of central Bangkok.  Formerly known as the Four Seasons Bangkok, it is situated opposite the Royal Bangkok Sports Club. The hotel is part of the Anantara Hotels, Resorts & Spas chain that is managed by the Minor International corporation.

History 
Constructed in 1978 as a Peninsula hotel, it was sold to Regent Hotels in 1982. Thereafter, Four Seasons undertook the management of the hotel until it was acquired by Regent in 1992. It was named the Regent Bangkok following its acquisition by Minor in 2001 until Minor renamed it the Four Seasons Bangkok in 2003. On 1 March 2015, with the aim of creating a flagship Anantara hotel in the center of Bangkok, Minor International renamed it the Anantara Siam Bangkok Hotel It is Anantara’s fourth hotel in the Thai capital, after Anantara Baan Rajprasong, Anantara Bangkok Riverside and Anantara Bangkok Sathorn.

Corporate social responsibility activities

Mai Khao Marine Turtle Foundation 
Mai Khao beach is among the few beaches in Phuket that act as nesting grounds for sea turtles. Thus, the Minor Hotel Group, as part of its conservation projects, set up the Mai Khao Marine Turtle Foundation (MKMTF) that engages in protecting and conserving endangered sea turtles in Phuket and other areas in Thailand. The foundation was founded with a donation of 45,000 US dollars donated by the JW Marriott Phuket Resort and Spa and the Minor Hotel Group. Through the Mai Khao Marine Turtle Foundation turtle eggs are collected from areas where they are threatened. There onwards they are handed over to the Phuket Marine Biological Centre (PMBC) and the Royal Thai Navy who provides a sanctuary for the eggs until they hatch and ensure the young turtles reach the sea safely.

Golden Triangle Asian Elephant Foundation 
Anantara Siam Bangkok Hotel is part of the hotel chain Anantara Hotels, Resorts & Spas, the founder of the Golden Triangle Asian Elephant Foundation  that was set up to uplift the lives of the Asian elephant in Thailand and the mahout communities. The foundation was established in 2005 in co-operation with Anantara Golden Triangle Elephant Camp and Resort. Currently 25 elephants and 60 people are benefitting from the foundation that is funded by Anantara Hotels, Resorts & Spas as well as from the donations of hotel guests.

Charity Run to raise funds for Cancer Research Centres, Thai Red Cross Society 
Anantara Siam Bangkok Hotel, formerly known as the Four Seasons Hotel Bangkok, in association with the Thai Red Cross Society has held a charity run for over 20 years in order to raise funds for research projects conducted by the Haematological Cancer Research Centre at King Chulalongkorn Memorial Hospital. The event is in partnership with Minor International and the Embassy of Canada to Thailand. The run is held within the premises of Bangkok's Lumphini Park. The Cancer Care Charity Fun Run of 2014, that was held for the 7th consecutive time in conjunction with sister properties Four Seasons Resort Chiang Mai and Four Seasons Resort Koh Samui, was able to raise THB 3.5 million in donations for the benefit of the Haematological Cancer Research Centre.

World Gourmet Festival to raise fund for Save the Child from HIV, Thai Red Cross Society 
The World Gourmet Festival is an annual event held at Anantara Siam Bangkok Hotel. Proceeds from the festival go towards the HRH Princess Soamsawali's Save A Child's Life from AIDS Project. The festival sees the participation of many international chefs, winemakers and food experts.

Partnerships 
 Virtuoso
 The American Chamber of Commerce in Thailand (AMCHAM)
 Thai Hotels Association
 Ratchaprasong Square Trade Association 
 Thailand International Cooperation Agency

Awards and achievements 
 Spice Market received TripAdvisor's Service Excellence 2014 (Tripadvisor, USA) 
 Four Seasons Hotel Bangkok received TripAdvisor's Hospitality Excellence 2014 (TripAdvisor, USA)
 Best Italian Restaurant 2013 - Biscotti (Ospitalita' Italiana, Italian Chambers of Commerce)
 Among the best CSR organizations on AMCHAM's Corporate Social Responsibility Excellence Recognition 2012 (Honored with Silver Status for receiving the recognition for 3 consecutive years, AMCHAM, Thailand)
 Readers’ Choice Awards – Top 100 Hotels in Asia (Conde Nast Traveler, USA)
 Among the World’s Best Hotels Gold List 2010 (Conde Nast Traveler, USA)

See also

References

Hotels in Thailand
Hotel buildings completed in 1978
Hotels in Bangkok